Sinotympana incomparabilis is a species of cicada from southern China that was discovered among a group of  unidentified specimens in the  in Brussels. It is the type species in the genus Sinotympana and belongs to the tribe Dundubiini.

References

External links 

Hemiptera of Asia
Insects of China
Insects described in 2009
Dundubiini